The list of the largest companies in the meat industry in Germany shows the 20 largest companies of the meat industry in Germany. The list comprises companies that are active in slaughtering pigs, cattle and poultry as well as in meat import, meat processing, meat packing and the production of meat products such as sausages.

List (2021) 
The following sorts the 20 largest meat companies in Germany by their revenue in Euro im the year 2021.

References 

Lists of companies by industry
Meat processing in Germany
Economy-related lists of superlatives